Pilar Ramírez Tello (born 1976 in Granada) is an English–Spanish translator of technical, literary and legal texts. She translated The Hunger Games and the Divergent series to Spanish.

Early life 
In 1994, Ramírez Tello studied at the University of Granada to pursue a degree in Translation and Interpreting. In 1999, after graduating, she extended her training by obtaining a Master's degree in Comparative Literature and Translation in the University of Binghamton, State of New York. A few years after finishing her Master's degree, she devoted herself to full-time literary translation.

Career 
She translated more than fifty books for publishers such as RBA, Salamandra and Penguin Random House. In addition to producing literary translations, she works as a freelance translator, and has worked for a year and a half as an adjunct professor of Spanish in the Department of Romance Languages at Binghamton University.

"Sinsajo"
Tello created the term "sinsajo", the iconic bird of the dystopian science fiction novel The Hunger Games. This word would later provide the Spanish title to the two last films of the saga. She has explained in several interviews the process involved in creating this word, whose English equivalent is ‘Mockingjay.’

In the story, Mockingjays were created essentially by accident. The father of the species was the jabberjay, a breed of exclusively male birds that were created as mutations by the Capitol. Initially created to eavesdrop on rebels during the Dark Days, jabberjays had the ability to memorize entire conversations and repeat them back to their Capitol handlers. However, once the rebels realized this, they simply fed endless lies to the birds, and sent them back loaded with false information. After the lies were discovered, the Capitol shut down the operation and the jabberjays were released into the wild, in the hope that they would die off. Eventually, they did die off, but not before passing on their genetic code by mating with female mockingbirds. This was unforeseen, because no one expected the jabberjays to be able to reproduce with other bird species. The offspring were called mockingjays. In Spanish "jabberjay" can be translated as "charlajo", meaning "a bird that can talk" ("charla") and "mockingjay" in Spanish is "sinsonte". So she combined these two names to create the new species: "sinsajo".

Translated books

References

1976 births
Spanish translators
People from Granada
Living people